Taeania is a Gram-negative, rod-shaped and non-motile genus of bacteria from the family of Flavobacteriaceae with one known species (Taeania maliponensis). Taeania maliponensis has been isolated from seawater from Korea.

References

Flavobacteria
Bacteria genera
Monotypic bacteria genera
Taxa described in 2016